Delik may refer to:

Delik Yarqan, Ardabil Province
Delik-e Tayebi, Kohgiluyeh and Boyer-Ahmad Province